Sidney "Sid" Judd (14 August 1928 – 24 February 1959) was a Welsh international rugby union flanker who played club rugby for Cardiff and Carmarthen Athletic. He won 10 caps for Wales and is best remembered for scoring one of Wales' two tries in their 1953 victory over New Zealand.

Rugby career
Judd began playing rugby as a schoolboy while at Cardiff High School. As a schoolboy he was selected for Welsh secondary schools and continued playing after he matriculated to Trinity College, Carmarthen, turning out for the college team. While in Carmarthen, Judd turned out as a senior for Carmarthen Athletic RFC. After leaving Trinity, he moved back to Cardiff becoming a school-teacher at Windsor Clive Secondary Modern School.

In 1946 he joined first-class Welsh team, Cardiff RFC. Judd was a consistent part of the Cardiff team, and in the ten seasons he turned out for the club he was selected 184 times scoring 45 tries. During the 1951/52 season, Judd was selected for invitational touring side the Barbarians and played in the Mobbs Memorial Match against East Midlands.

International matches played
Wales
  1953, 1954, 1955
  1953, 1954
  1953
  1953
  1953, 1954, 1955

References

Bibliography 
 

 

1928 births
1959 deaths
Rugby union players from Cardiff
Welsh rugby union players
Rugby union flankers
Wales international rugby union players
Cardiff RFC players
Barbarian F.C. players
People associated with Trinity University College
Deaths from leukemia